Hey Darling may refer to:

Songs 
 "Hey Darling", by Ace of Base, from the album Da Capo
 "Hey Darling", by The Spencer Davis Group, from the album The Second Album